The 2014 Warrington Borough Council election took place on 22 May 2014 to elect 19 of the 57 members of the Warrington Borough Council in England. They formed part of the United Kingdom's local elections of 2014.

Results

References

External links

2014 English local elections
2014
2010s in Cheshire